The Hafei Saibao III is a 4-door compact sedan produced by the Chinese car manufacturer Hafei. The design was first shown to the public at the 2005 Geneva Motor Show. It was designed by Pininfarina.

Overview

The Hafei Saibao III is powered by a 1.6-litre (1584 cc) petrol Mitsubishi Orion engine (4G18) producing  and equipped with a 5-speed manual gearbox.

The Saibao provides the basis of the Coda EV, exported to the US between 2012 and 2013. Also sold as a Mullen 700e in the U.S.A. in 2015.

References

External links
official website

Pininfarina
Cars of China
Sedans
Front-wheel-drive vehicles

Cars introduced in 2005